Jacek Chmielnik (January 31, 1953 in Łódź, Poland – August 22, 2007 in Suchawa, Poland) was a Polish stage and film actor.

External links
Obituary 

1953 births
2007 deaths
20th-century Polish male actors
Accidental deaths by electrocution
Łódź Film School alumni
Actors from Łódź
Polish male film actors
Polish male stage actors
Polish theatre directors
Polish Roman Catholics